The 2000 Preakness Stakes was the 125th running of the Preakness Stakes thoroughbred horse race. The race took place on May 20, 2000, and was televised in the United States on the ABC television network. Red Bullet, who was jockeyed by Jerry Bailey, won the race three and three quarter lengths over runner-up Fusaichi Pegasus. Approximate post time was 5:28 p.m. Eastern Time. The race was run over a track listed as good in a final time of 1:56.04.  The Maryland Jockey Club reported total attendance of 111,821, this is recorded as second highest on the list of American thoroughbred racing top attended events for North America in 2000.

Payout 

The 126th Preakness Stakes Payout Schedule

 $2 Exacta: (4–7) paid $24.00
 $2 Trifecta: (4–7–3) paid $115.80
 $1 Superfecta: (4–7–3–6) paid $235.50

The full chart 

 Winning Breeder: Frank Stonach; (KY) 
 Final Time: 1:56.04
 Track Condition: Good
 Total Attendance: 111,821

See also 

 2000 Kentucky Derby
 2000 Belmont Stakes

References

External links 
 

2000
2000 in horse racing
2000 in American sports
2000 in sports in Maryland
Horse races in Maryland